I Believe is a live album by Marvin Sapp and his debut on Verity Records. Most of the album was recorded in 1999, but it was delayed due to problems with Word Records. It was then pushed to the spring of 2001 then pushed to 2002 when Sapp signed with Zomba.

Track listing

Chart positions

Personnel

Band
Percy Bady - keyboards
Raymond Bady - drums, drum programming
Simeon Baker - bass
Derrick Buckingham - guitar
Sean Cooper- Talkbox
Rodney East - Piano
Maurice Fitzgerald - bass
Terry Baker - drums
Gerald Haddon - keyboards
Ralph Lofton - organ
Desabata Robinson - guitar
Paul Wright III - keyboards
Terry Moore - organ
Charles Willis - guitar

Background Vocals
Cynthia Jernigan
Brittany Bowen
Malique Grear
Percy Bady
Clarence Ellis

References

2002 albums
Marvin Sapp albums